The Gujarat State Football Association (abbreviated GSFA) is one of the 37 Indian state football associations that are affiliated to the All India Football Federation.

Background 
Gujarat State Football Association (GSFA) is the governing body for football in the state of Gujarat.

Affiliated teams
 Gujarat football team

References

External links
 Official page at AIFF

Football governing bodies in India
Football in Gujarat
1961 establishments in Gujarat
Sports organizations established in 1961
Organisations based in Ahmedabad